Sarah Joanne Clackson (née Quinn) (11 December 1965 – 10 August 2003) was a British Coptologist; she was Britain's foremost Coptologist.

Born in Leicester, she was educated at Loughborough High School and St John's College, Cambridge where she studied classics and Egyptology. She obtained a PhD from UCL in 1996; her PhD at University College London was completed in four years, resulting in her first major book, Coptic and Greek texts Relating to the Hermopolite Monastery of Apa Apollo (2000). At the same time, she was working as Project Officer for the Manichaean Documentation Centre based first at the Institute of Classical Studies, London, and then at Warwick University; The Dictionary of Manichaean Texts, volume i, Texts from the Roman Empire (1998), bears her name among its authors, as does The Elephantine Papyri in English (1996). Our Father who writes: orders from the Monastery of Apollo at Bawit, was published in 2008.

She held the Eugénie Strong Fellowship in Arts at Girton College (1996–98) and the Lady Wallis Budge Fellowship in Egyptology at Christ's College (from 1998). A fund in her name, Sarah (J.) Clackson Coptic Fund, enables scholars to access her papers, which are held in the Archive of the Griffith Institute, Oxford, and to further her work in Coptic and papyrology.  

She married fellow Old Loughburian and Cambridge academic James Clackson in 1991. She was diagnosed with cancer in 1998 and died peacefully at home at 3.00 p.m. on Sunday 10 August 2003. Her funeral took place at the West Chapel, Cambridge Crematorium, at 12.45 p.m. on Tuesday 19 August. 

Her memorial is at the Parish of the Ascension Burial Ground in Cambridge.

External links

1965 births
2003 deaths
Alumni of St John's College, Cambridge
Alumni of University College London
Fellows of Girton College, Cambridge
Fellows of Christ's College, Cambridge
Coptologists
People educated at Loughborough High School